The Appenweier–Strasbourg railway is a major railway line linking the French TGV station at Strasbourg with the German Rhine Valley Railway (Rheintalbahn) and the Karlsruhe–Basel high-speed railway (between Offenburg and Baden-Baden stations). It is almost entirely double-tracked and fully electrified. The section between Kehl and Appenweier is undergoing modernisation with the goal of a maximum speed of 200 km/h. The French section is owned by SNCF; the German section is owned by Deutsche Bahn.

References

External links

Railway lines in Baden-Württemberg
Railway lines in Grand Est
Cross-border railway lines in France
Buildings and structures in Ortenaukreis
Cross-border railway lines in Germany
France–Germany border